The Sierra de la Culebra, or Serra da Coroa (in Portuguese), is a mountain range in Castile and León, northwest Spain, and northeastern Portugal. It lies 7 km south of Puebla de Sanabria in the comarcas of Aliste, Sanabria and La Carballeda (Zamora Province), as well as Vinhais and Bragança municipalities in the District of Bragança.

The Sierra de la Culebra is a 95 km long regular mountain chain of medium height, forming a natural border with the Portuguese region of Tras os Montes on its western end. Its slopes are wooded, occasionally ravaged by forest fires. The summits of the range  are often covered with snow in the winter and there are odd-looking rocky quartzite outcrops on them.

Among the rivers in Spain and Portugal having their source in Sierra de la Culebra, the Castro River, Tera, Tuella, Sabor and Maçãs (Manzanas), deserve mention.

These mountains are famous as one of the few remaining strongholds of the Iberian wolf.

Subranges
The Sierra de la Culebra is a southeastern prolongation of Sierra Segundera, at the southern fringes of the Macizo Galaico-Leonés. The western prolongations of Serra de Montezinho or Maciço de Montesinho, Sierra de la Gamoneda and Sierra del Marabón are part of the Sierra de la Culebra mountainous system. Other subranges are Sierra de las Cavernas, Sierra de los Cantadores and Sierra de las Carbas, located on the Spanish side.

One important feature is the Rock of the Three Kingdoms dividing three ancient Iberian kingdoms in the Serra de Marabón subrange.

Natural reserves
On the Portuguese side the area of the Sierra de la Culebra range is included in the Montesinho Natural Park.

The Reserva de Caza de la Sierra de la Culebra, is a national hunting forest reserve on the Spanish side. Controversially, the wolves are protected in the reserve in order that they may be shot by sportsmen on payment of a fee of several thousand Euros. This process is defended on the grounds that it helps pay for the upkeep of the reserve and thus the protection of the species as a whole. The number of wolves authorised for hunting each year in Spain is strictly controlled, the auction being carried out in Villardeciervos, but many more are shot illegally.

In the Sierra de la Culebra reserve, wolves may occasionally be observed when attracted to a bait-station, known locally as a Muladar, where remains of dead horses and donkeys are put out for them.

On the Sierra de la Culebra reserve there is a healthy population of the wolves' main prey species - roe deer, red deer and wild boar. The presence of the carcasses put out for the wolves also attracts spectacular raptors such as the griffon vulture.

There are also small colonies of Vipera latastei and Coronella austriaca, which perhaps gave the mountains their name.

Gallery

See also
Montesinho Natural Park

References

External links

 Conocer Zamora
 Sierra de la Culebra 
Ayuntamiento de Tábara, Turismo - La Sierra de la Culebra

Galician Massif
Mountain ranges of Portugal
Mountain ranges of Castile and León